The 1980–81 Combined Counties Football League season was the third in the history of the Combined Counties Football League, a football competition in England.

The league was won by Malden Town for the first time.

League table

The league was expanded from 15 to 19 clubs as four new clubs joined:
Cranleigh
Farnham Town, joining from the London Spartan League Premier Division.
Lingfield
Wrecclesham

Godalming & Farncombe United were renamed Godalming Town.

References

External links
 Combined Counties League Official Site

1980-81
1980–81 in English football leagues